KWWM (91.3 FM) is a college music radio station licensed to Rock Springs, Wyoming. The station is owned and operated by Western Wyoming Community College.

The station received a license on March 28, 2012.

References

External links

WWM
Radio stations established in 2012
WWM